This is a list of earthquakes in France and its overseas territories which directly impacted the country. Earthquakes in mainland France are rare but they do occur. In mainland France, the east of the country Alsace, Jura, Alps, the South-East Alpes-Maritimes, Provence and the Pyrenees are the most concerned, but the most seismically active regions are parts of Overseas France (such as New Caledonia, Martinique, Guadeloupe, Wallis and Futuna and Réunion). Buildings are vulnerable, the risk of tsunamis are also prominent.

Earthquakes

References

Earthquakes in France
Earthquakes in Martinique
Earthquakes
France